Mykola Fedorovych Krotov (Nikolai Fyodorovich Krotov; 1898–1978) was a Ukrainian and Soviet football player and manager. He is also a veteran of World War I.

Honours
 USSR champion: 1924.

International career
Krotov played his only game for USSR on 15 May 1925 in a friendly against Turkey.

External links
  Profile

1898 births
1978 deaths
Footballers from Kharkiv
People from Kharkov Governorate
Ukrainian footballers
Soviet footballers
Soviet Union international footballers
Soviet football managers
FC Dynamo Kharkiv players
FC Metalist Kharkiv players
FC Lokomotyv Kharkiv managers
FC Dynamo Kharkiv managers
Association football defenders